The Iringa–Sumbawanga High Voltage Power Line, also Iringa–Mbeya–Tunduma–Sumbawanga High Voltage Power Line, is a high voltage electricity power line, under development in Tanzania. The 400 kiloVolts power line will connect the high voltage substation at Iringa, to another high voltage substation at Sumbawanga.

Location 

Overview 
The Iringa–Sumbawanga High Voltage Power Line serves two main purposes. The first is to create a high voltage backbone in the central and southern regions of Tanzania, stabilize the electricity grid and promote development in those communities.
The second major purpose is to allow exchange of grid electricity between Tanzania and Zambia, and ultimately between the Eastern Africa Power Pool to which Tanzania belongs and the Southern African Power Pool to which Tanzania ad Zambia belong.

Construction
In June 2018, the World Bank Group committed to lend the Government of Tanzania, US$455 million, towards the execution of this infrastructure project. As part of this project, the electricity substation at Iringa will be updated from 220kV to 400kV, and new substations will be erected at Kisada, Mbeya, Tunduma and Sumbawanga. Work will also include a  double-circuit line from Tunduma to the Zambian border, which will be energized at 330kV. As of February 2020, the project was at tendering stage.

See also 
 Energy in Tanzania
 Isinya–Singida High Voltage Power Line

References

External links 
 Website of Tanzania Electric Supply Company Limited
 Tanzania’s power initiative receives major boost from the World Bank As of 27 June 2018.

High-voltage transmission lines in Tanzania
Energy in Tanzania
Energy infrastructure in Africa
Proposed electric power transmission systems
Proposed electric power infrastructure in Tanzania